The Twins are a German synth-pop duo formed in Berlin in 1980. Their most successful singles include "Face to Face – Heart to Heart", "Not the Loving Kind", "Ballet Dancer" and "Love System."

Discography

Albums

Singles

DVDs
2005 – Live in Sweden
2009 – Video Classics and Rare Clips

Citations

External links 

 
 

Musical groups established in 1980
German new wave musical groups
Eurodisco groups
German musical duos
Musical groups from Berlin
Synth-pop new wave musical groups
Male musical duos
New wave duos
Hansa Records artists
Columbia Records artists